Mineralogy is a mining company owned by Clive Palmer of Queensland, Australia. Mineralogy's mining projects are now producing and generating income.

Mineralogy signed a deal with the Chinese infrastructure company CITIC Pacific to develop a small portion of a large iron ore deposit in the Pilbara region of Western Australia. The agreement involves the development of two magnetite mines and construction of port infrastructure at Cape Preston. Mineralogy was paid 415 million for the rights to mine the ore. According to Palmer the reserves contain 160 billion tonnes of iron ore.

The company owns thermal coal deposits situated in the Galilee Basin. Estimates of the size of the deposits reach 100  billion tonnes of coal.

Mineralogy has been in a long running legal dispute with CITIC Limited’s (formerly CITIC Pacific Limited) Australian subsidiary companies that are exploiting the magnetite mine in the Pilbara region of Western Australia. In 2013 Mineralogy commenced legal proceedings to resolve a dispute about royalties it claimed to be due to it, which in 2017 the Western Australian Supreme Court delivered judgement in favour of Mineralogy.

The CITIC parties appealed the decision of the trial judge to the Court of Appeal, but lost.

The outcome of the proceedings above is that Mineralogy received US$350 million with ongoing royalties of US$ 200 million annually. As at 30 June 2018, Mineralogy had consolidated Net Asset Position reported at a value of AUD $450,959,878 (audited).

On 27 September 2018, Clive Palmer also confirmed that as a result of the wins in the Western Australian Courts and the subsequent payments of royalties to Mineralogy, work has re-commenced by Blue Star Line to build Titanic II. Blue Star Line is a subsidiary company of Mineralogy.

Titanic II is forecast to set sail in 2022, and to follow the original route of the Titanic.

Mineralogy took Western Australia to the High Court over the Iron Ore Processing (Mineralogy Pty Ltd) Agreement Amendment Act 2022 in Mineralogy v Western Australia, but lost.

In 2022, Mineralogy donated $116 million dollars to the United Australia Party, which won a single seat in the upper house in the 2022 federal election.

See also

Mining in Australia

References

External links 
 Company Website

Mining companies of Australia
Mining in Queensland
Companies based in Queensland
Non-renewable resource companies established in 1984